Islamic unity week (Persian: هفته وحدت اسلامی) refers to a ceremony held every year both by Sunnis and Shia. The event is held between two dates of the birthday of prophet Muhammad. One of the dates is narrated by Sunnis and the other narrated by Shia.

History
The previous record of the Islamic unity week is related to the time when Seyyed Ali Khamenei was in Sistan and Baluchestan; and this Shia cleric/scholar (with the co-operation of some Sunni scholars) decided to hold this unity week, and they celebrated these days (Islamic unity week) to show the unity between Shia-Sunni.

After Iranian Revolution, Ayatollah Ruhollah Khomeini proposed to call the interval between the two dates as Islamic unity week. Ayatollah Montazeri suggests to ayatollah Khomeini to call the week as Islamic unity week in reaction to the Saudi Mufti's attacks on Sunnis and Shia.

The two dates are the twelfth of Rabi Al Awwal, the first week of the third lunar month of the Islamic calendar, according to Sunnis, and the seventeenth of Rabi al Awwal, according to Shia.

Events
While Wahhabi clerics regard the celebration of the Holy Prophet's birthday inconsistent with Islam, this claim is refuted by most Sunnis and Shias. The principal idea of the ceremony suggested by the government of the Islamic republic of Iran. Every year, the Islamic republic of Iran holds an international conference of Shia and Sunni eminent scholars and other Muslim participants from all over the world.

Dependent organizations and occasions
There are two wide organizations considered with the subject of Islamic unity of Muslim community: The World Forum for Proximity of Islamic Schools of Thought and the organization of Islamic propaganda. Meanwhile, the conference of Islamic unity with determined aims is held every year.

See also
 Shia–Sunni relations
 Shia Crescent
 Shia Muslims in the Arab world
 Sunni fatwas on Shias
 The World Forum for Proximity of Islamic Schools of Thought

References

Shia–Sunni relations